Sidi Bellahssan El Halfaoui Mosque  is a Tunisian mosque in the Halfaouine neighborhood in the Medina of Tunis in Tunisia.

It was built in 1640, in the Mouradite era, to commemorate Bellahssan El Halfaoui, one of the Sidi Mohammed El Halfaoui descendants, a practitioner of tariqa and the shadhili. His mausoleum is close to the mosque, on Hammam El Remimi Street.

References 

Mosques in Tunis
17th-century mosques